John Taylor-Smith  (20 April 1860 – 28 March 1938) was an Anglican bishop and military chaplain. He was the Anglican Bishop of Sierra Leone by the end of the 19th century and the Chaplain-General to the Forces  from the year 1901 to 1925.

Early life and education
John Taylor-Smith was born in 1860 in Kendal, Westmorland, England. He is the son of John Smith.

Ordained Ministry
Taylor-Smith was ordained in the Church of England as a deacon in 1885 and as a priest in 1886. From 1885 to 1890, he served his curacy at St Paul's Church, Penge in the Diocese of Rochester. He then moved to colonial Sierra Leone, and served as Sub-Dean of St. George's Cathedral, Freetown, and Diocesan Missioner from 1890 to 1897. In 1897, he was consecrated to the episcopate as Bishop of Sierra Leone. He was also an Honorary Chaplain to the Queen (QHC) from 1896 to 1901.

On 1 November 1901, John Taylor-Smith was appointed Chaplain-General to the Forces, and therefore head of the Army Chaplains' Department. His tenure included the First World War, and he oversaw the expansion of the Army Chaplains' Department from around 120 chaplains in 1914 to almost 3,500 in 1918. He retired in 1925.

Having been appointed a Sub-Prelate of the Venerable Order of Saint John in 1916, Taylor-Smith continued in that role in retirement. He died on 28 March 1938.

Honours
Taylor-Smith was appointed as the Commander of the Royal Victorian Order (CVO) in 1906, and a Companion of the Order of the Bath (CB) in 1921. He created a Knight Commander of the Order of the Bath (KCB) in 1925. As a clergyman, traditionally he would not have received the 'accolade' and thus was not entitled to style himself 'Sir'. He was awarded an honorary Doctor of Divinity (DD) degree in 1897.

References

1860 births
1938 deaths
People from Kendal
19th-century Anglican bishops in Sierra Leone
20th-century Anglican bishops in Sierra Leone
Chaplains General to the Forces
English Anglican missionaries
Anglican missionaries in Sierra Leone
Anglican bishops of Sierra Leone
Knights Commander of the Order of the Bath
Commanders of the Royal Victorian Order
Sub-Prelates of the Venerable Order of Saint John
Evangelical Anglican bishops